The 1953–54 international cricket season was from September 1953 to April 1954.

Season overview

November

Commonwealth in India

December

New Zealand in South Africa

Pakistan in Ceylon

January

England in the West Indies

India in Ceylon

February

Fiji in New Zealand

March

New Zealand in Australia

References

International cricket competitions by season
1953 in cricket
1954 in cricket